Jean-Louis Masson (born 5 February 1954) is a French politician and retired Gendarmerie officer who represented the 3rd constituency of the Var department in the National Assembly from 2017 until his resignation in 2020. A member of The Republicans (LR), he has served as Mayor of La Garde since 2020, previously holding the office from 2001 to 2017.

Career
Masson was elected to the mayorship of La Garde, Var in the 2001 municipal election as a member of the Union for French Democracy. He was reelected in 2008 and 2014 before resigning the office to take his seat in Parliament in 2017.

In the 2020 municipal election, he returned as Mayor of La Garde, a position his father Louis Masson previously held from 1959 to 1962. Masson was succeeded in the National Assembly by his substitute Édith Audibert.

Masson has also served as a departmental councillor for the canton of La Garde since 2021, previously holding a seat from 2004 (elected under the Union for a Popular Movement banner, later The Republicans) until his resignation in 2017 following his election to Parliament. In 2022, he was elected President of the Departmental Council of Var. He had held the council's first vice presidency from 2015 until 2017 and again from 2021 until 2022.

Honours 
Masson was made a Knight of the National Order of Merit in 1992 and of the Legion of Honour in 1998. He was made a colonel in the National Gendarmerie in 1999, retiring from active service in 2000.

See also 
 2017 French legislative election

References

External links 
  Jean-Louis Masson, 2017-2022.nosdeputes.fr.

Living people
1954 births
Politicians from Provence-Alpes-Côte d'Azur
People from Var (department)
Union for French Democracy politicians
Union for a Popular Movement politicians
The Republicans (France) politicians
Deputies of the 15th National Assembly of the French Fifth Republic
Members of Parliament for Var
Chevaliers of the Légion d'honneur
Departmental councillors (France)
Presidents of French departments
Mayors of places in Provence-Alpes-Côte d'Azur
Officers of the National Gendarmerie